Dana Paani is a 1989 Indian Hindi-language film directed by Deven Verma, starring Ashok Kumar, Mithun Chakraborty, Padmini Kolhapure, Nirupa Roy, Sadashiv Amrapurkar, Aruna Irani, Shafi Inamdar, Asha Sachdev and Deven Verma.

Plot

Dana Paani is an action film with  Mithun Chakraborty and Padmini Kolhapure playing the lead roles, supported by Ashok Kumar, Nirupa Roy, Prem Chopra and Sadashiv Amrapurkar.

Music
"Dhokha Dhokha" - Padmini Kolhapure, Anu Malik
"Dana Pani" - Anup Jalota
"Dana Pani" v2 - Anup Jalota
"Dana Pani" v3 - Anup Jalota
"Jiski Bitiya Badi Ho Gayi" - Anu Malik
"Chik Chik Mirchi" - Padmini Kolhapure

Cast

Mithun Chakraborty as Satya Prakash Tripathi
Padmini Kolhapure as Satya's fiancée 
Nirupa Roy as Satya Prakash's Mother
Ashok Kumar as Sinha Lawyer 
Aruna Irani as Savitri Devi
Sadashiv Amrapurkar as Kutti Seth
Shafi Inamdar as Gautam Prakash Tripathi
Sharat Saxena as Street Beggar
Deven Verma as Pampu Seth
Manik Irani as  Zorro Goon
Sudhir Dalvi as The Judge
Rajesh Puri as Pyare Bhai
Shreeram Lagoo as Singh Saab
Mohan Choti as Driver
Baby Ghazala as Gauri
Pinchoo Kapoor as (cameo appearance)

References

External links
 
 http://www.bollywoodhungama.com/movies/cast/5263/index.html
 http://ibosnetwork.com/asp/filmbodetails.asp?id=Dana+Paani -

1989 films
1980s Hindi-language films
Indian action films
Films scored by Anu Malik
Films directed by Deven Verma
1989 action films
Hindi-language action films